The 2015 FINA Swimming World Cup was a series of eight, two-day, long course swimming meets in eight different cities between August and November 2015. Airweave was the title sponsor for the series, with Omega serving as official timer. This was the first World Cup edition held in a long-course pool, allowing swimmers to prepare for next year's Olympics, which are also held in long course.

Meets
The 2015 World Cup consisted of the following eight meets:

* The finals session of the first day of the Singapore meet was cancelled due to haze conditions. On the second day events proceeded normally.

World Cup standings
 Composition of points:
 Best performances (by meets): 1st place: 24 points, 2nd place: 18 points and 3rd place: 12 points;
 Points for medals (in individual events): gold medal: 12 points, silver medal: 9 points and bronze medal: 6 points;
 Bonus for world record (WR): 20 points.

Men
Overall top 10:

Women
Overall top 10:

Event winners

50 m freestyle

100 m freestyle

200 m freestyle

400 m freestyle

1500 m (men)/800 m (women) freestyle

50 m backstroke

100 m backstroke

200 m backstroke

50 m breaststroke

100 m breaststroke

200 m breaststroke

50 m butterfly

100 m butterfly

200 m butterfly

200 m individual medley

400 m individual medley

Legend:

References

FINA Swimming World Cup
FINA Swimming World Cup